Connor Edwards (born 28 June 1997) is a Welsh rugby union player who plays for Dragons as a centre.

Edwards made his debut for the Dragons in 2015 having previously played for the Dragons academy, Bedwas RFC and Cross Keys RFC.

References

External links 
Dragons profile
itsrugby.co.uk profile

1997 births
Living people
Dragons RFC players
Rugby union players from Cwmbran
Welsh rugby union players
Rugby union centres
Doncaster Knights players
Jersey Reds players